Asian Highway 87 (AH87) is a road in the Asian Highway Network running 606 km (379 miles) from Ankara to Izmir, Turkey. The route is as follows:

Turkey
 Road D200: Ankara - Sivrihisar
 Road D260: Sivrihisar - Afyonkarahisar
 Road D300: Afyonkarahisar - Uşak - Izmir

Asian Highway Network

Roads in Turkey